The 2018 Jalisco Open was a professional tennis tournament played on hard courts. It was the eighth edition of the tournament which was part of the 2018 ATP Challenger Tour. It took place in Guadalajara, Mexico between 16 and 22 April 2018.

Singles main-draw entrants

Seeds

 1 Rankings as of April 9, 2018.

Other entrants
The following players received wildcards into the singles main draw:
  Tigre Hank
  Gerardo López Villaseñor
  Luis Patiño
  Manuel Sánchez

The following players received entry into the singles main draw as alternates:
  José Hernández-Fernández
  Ante Pavić

The following players received entry from the qualifying draw:
  Gonzalo Escobar
  Federico Gaio
  João Souza
  James Ward

Champions

Singles

 Marcelo Arévalo def.  Christopher Eubanks 6–4, 5–7, 7–6(7–4).

Doubles

 Marcelo Arévalo /  Miguel Ángel Reyes-Varela def.  Brydan Klein /  Ruan Roelofse 7–6(7–3), 7–5.

External links
Official Website

2018 ATP Challenger Tour
2018
2018 in Mexican tennis